KYEE (94.3 FM, "94 KEY") is a radio station licensed to serve Alamogordo, New Mexico.  The station is owned by Burt Broadcasting, Inc.  It airs a Contemporary Hit Radio music format.

The station was assigned the KYEE call letters by the Federal Communications Commission on September 1, 1987. KYEE has a construction permit to increase erp.

References

External links
 Official Website

YEE
Contemporary hit radio stations in the United States
Radio stations established in 1987